Raimonds Vilde (born August 19, 1962) is a former Latvian volleyball player who competed in the 1988 Summer Olympics.

He was born in Riga.

In 1988 he was part of the Soviet team which won the silver medal in the Olympic tournament. He played six matches.

Currently coaching Latvian Men's National Volleyball Team. Received a prize "Example in Sport" during Latvian Yearly Sports Awards ceremony in December, 2012.

External links
 profile

1962 births
Living people
Latvian men's volleyball players
Soviet men's volleyball players
Olympiacos S.C. players
Olympic volleyball players of the Soviet Union
Volleyball players at the 1988 Summer Olympics
Olympic silver medalists for the Soviet Union
Sportspeople from Riga
Olympic medalists in volleyball
Latvian volleyball coaches
Medalists at the 1988 Summer Olympics
Honoured Masters of Sport of the USSR